Anaphalioides is a genus of flowering plants in the family Asteraceae described as a genus in 1950. They are native to New Zealand and New Guinea.

 Species
 Anaphalioides alpina (Cockayne) D.Glenny - New Zealand 
 Anaphalioides bellidioides (G.Forst.) D.Glenny - New Zealand incl. Antipodean + Chatham Islands 
 Anaphalioides hookeri (Allan) Anderb. - New Zealand South Island 
 Anaphalioides mariae (F.Muell.) Glenny - New Zealand, Papua New Guinea 
 Anaphalioides papuana (F.Muell.) Glenny - New Zealand, Papua New Guinea 
 Anaphalioides subrigida (Colenso) Anderb - New Zealand North Island 
 Anaphalioides trinervis (G.Forst.) Anderb. - New Zealand

References

Asteraceae genera
Gnaphalieae